Miroslav Dudekov (born 23 May 1955) is a Bulgarian fencer. He competed in the individual and team sabre events at the 1976 Summer Olympics.

References

1955 births
Living people
Olympic fencers of Bulgaria
Fencers at the 1976 Summer Olympics
Bulgarian male sabre fencers